Jack Mortimer (30 October 1912 – 8 February 1973) was an Australian politician. He received a primary education before becoming a farmer in South Australia. He served in the military from 1942 to 1946 and returned as a waterside worker in Port Lincoln where he was a branch secretary of the Waterside Workers' Federation. In 1963, he was elected to the Australian House of Representatives as the Labor member for Grey. He held the seat until his defeat in 1966, after which he became a businessman in Port Lincoln. Mortimer died by drowning at Port Hedland in 1973.

Personal life

Mortimer married Melva Bähr, of Ceduna, in 1939. They had a daughter and a son, and farmed at Karkoo.

References

1912 births
1973 deaths
Australian Labor Party members of the Parliament of Australia
Members of the Australian House of Representatives for Grey
Members of the Australian House of Representatives
Australian waterside workers
Australian trade unionists
20th-century Australian politicians
Deaths by drowning in Australia